Frank Proto (born July 18, 1941 in Brooklyn, New York) is an American composer and bassist. He was a double bass student of Fred Zimmermann and David Walter. He is a graduate of the Manhattan School of Music in 1966 with a Master of Music. A self-taught composer, Proto has played and composed for a wide range of ensembles and soloists including Dave Brubeck, Eddie Daniels, Duke Ellington, Cleo Laine, Sherrill Milnes, Gerry Mulligan, Roberta Peters, Francois Rabbath, Ruggiero Ricci, Doc Severinsen and Richard Stoltzman.

Career
Proto worked as a double bassist and composer-in-residence with the Cincinnati Symphony Orchestra from 1966 to 1997. The orchestra premiered over 25 new works including concertos and solo works for violin, cello, double bass, clarinet, trumpet, tuba and percussion. He also composed and arranged music for Young People's and Pops concerts including Casey at the Bat—an American Folk Tale for Narrator and Orchestra and A Carmen Fantasy for Trumpet and Orchestra.

Between 1982 and 1989, Proto was a Synclavier artist. He composed works in different genres both with and for the system, the most notable being the Dialogue for Synclavier and Orchestra, commissioned by the Cincinnati Symphony Orchestra and conducted by then music director Michael Gielen. His chamber music work, The Death of Desdemona for Double Bass and Synclavier, is part of the double bass repertoire.

Proto is among the most prolific composers of music for the double bass. His output includes 7 works with orchestra and over 30 solo and chamber music works. He has also composed extensively for the violin, viola and clarinet. His 2007 CD/DVD Bridges - Eddie Daniels plays the music of Frank Proto consisting of a series of works written for clarinet virtuoso Eddie Daniels was nominated for a Grammy Award.

Proto's 30-year collaboration with the French/Syrian virtuoso Francois Rabbath has resulted in 5 works for double bass and orchestra.

As a solo double bassist Proto has been widely recorded in an ongoing series of his chamber works by Red Mark Records.

In 2010, Proto's boxing opera Shadowboxer, based on the life of Joe Louis—libretto by John Chenault, directed by Leon Major—was given its premiere by the University of Maryland Opera Studio.

External links
Frank Proto's Web Page
Frank Proto's Compositions
Frank Proto Recordings
Interview with Frank Proto, June 15, 1988

1941 births
20th-century classical composers
21st-century American composers
21st-century classical composers
American classical composers
American classical double-bassists
Male double-bassists
American male classical composers
American opera composers
American people of Italian descent
Living people
Male opera composers
Manhattan School of Music alumni
20th-century American composers
21st-century double-bassists
20th-century American male musicians
21st-century American male musicians